"" ("The little train") is a song by Moldovan folk punk band Zdob și Zdub and folk musicians Frații Advahov. The song represented Moldova in the Eurovision Song Contest 2022.

Context 
The song talks about an energetic and happy train ride between the capitals of Moldova and Romania, Chișinău and Bucharest, respectively. According to the band, the music video that was released for the song was coincided with the reopening of a train route between the two cities.

Eurovision Song Contest

Internal selection 
For the 2022 contest, the Moldovan national broadcaster, TeleRadio-Moldova (TRM), broadcast the event within Moldova and organised the selection process for the nation's entry. TRM confirmed their intentions to participate at the 2022 Eurovision Song Contest on 20 October 2021. Moldova has selected their entry via a national selection show between 2008 and 2020, while their entry in 2021 was selected via an internal selection. The internal selection procedure was continued for their 2022 participation following the cancellation of a planned national selection due to COVID-19 restrictions.

The live audition round took place on 29 January 2022 at TRM Studio 2 in Chișinău and was broadcast on Moldova 1, Moldova 2 and Radio Moldova as well as online via trm.md and via TRM's Facebook and YouTube pages. The votes of an expert jury selected "" performed by Zdob și Zdub and Frații Advahov as the Moldovan entry for the Eurovision Song Contest 2022. Entries were assessed on criteria such as voice quality and strength of the composition. The jury panel that evaluated the songs consisted of Geta Burlacu (singer, 2008 Moldovan Eurovision entrant), Vali Boghean (singer-songwriter), Cristina Scarlat (singer, 2014 Moldovan Eurovision entrant), Victoria Cușnir (journalist) and Aliona Moon (singer, 2013 Moldovan Eurovision entrant).

At Eurovision 
The 66th edition of the Eurovision Song Contest took place in Turin, Italy and consisted of two semi-finals on 10 May and 12 May 2022, and the grand final on 14 May 2022. According to Eurovision rules, all nations with the exceptions of the host country and the "Big Five" (France, Germany, Italy, Spain and the United Kingdom) are required to qualify from one of two semi-finals in order to compete for the final; the top ten countries from each semi-final progress to the final. The European Broadcasting Union (EBU) split up the competing countries into six different pots based on voting patterns from previous contests, with countries with favourable voting histories put into the same pot.

Charts

References 

2021 songs
2021 singles
Eurovision songs of 2022
Eurovision songs of Moldova
Zdob și Zdub songs
Songs about cities
Songs about trains